Barbara Stripling is an American librarian and is the President of the Freedom to Read Foundation, a non-profit legal and educational organization affiliated with the American Library Association. Stripling served as president of the American Library Association from 2013 to 2014. During her term as president, she stressed that "Libraries Change Lives."

Career 
In July 2018, Stripling retired from her position as Senior Associate Dean at Syracuse University's School of Information Studies. She had previously served as Assistant Professor of Practice at Syracuse University. She started her career as a school librarian, and served as Director of Library Services for the New York City schools, a school library media specialist and school district director of libraries in Arkansas, and a library grant program director in Tennessee.

Stripling also serves on the board of the Freedom to Read Foundation. She was first elected as a trustee in 2018, reelected in 2020, and was later named president.

Awards 
2017 recipient of the Joseph W. Lippincott Award from the American Library Association.
2014 President's Award, presented by the Arkansas Library Association.
2012 New York State School Library System Association's Distinguished Service Award.
1990 Arkansas School Library Media Specialist of the Year.
1989 Retta Patrick Award, presented by the Arkansas Library Association.

Selected publications 
Stripling, Barbara K., and Sandra Hughes-Hassell. Curriculum Connections Through the Library. Westport: Libraries Unlimited, 2003. 
Stripling, Barbara K. Learning and Libraries in an Information Age: Principles and Practice. Englewood, Colorado: Libraries Unlimited and its Division Teacher Ideas Press, 1999. 
Stripling, Barbara K., and Judy M. Pitts. Brainstorms and Blueprints: Teaching Library Research As a Thinking Process. Englewood, Colorado: Libraries Unlimited, 1988.

References 

 
 

American librarians
American women librarians
Syracuse University faculty
Presidents of the American Library Association
Living people
Year of birth missing (living people)
Place of birth missing (living people)
American women academics
21st-century American women